Proloy (English: Disaster) is a 2013 Indian Bengali crime thriller film written and directed by Raj Chakraborty, produced by Shree Venkatesh Films, starring Mimi Chakraborty, Saswata Chatterjee, and Paran Bandopadhyay. This movie is inspired on the life of Barun Biswas, a social activist and teacher. The film's music is by Indraadip Dasgupta in his second collaboration with Banerjee, with 2 additional tracks by Nilesh Dasgupta. The film was critically and commercially well received and the performances along with the direction was praised. Due to multiple creative differences, this was Sonali Banerjee's last film with Shree Venkatesh Films. Sonali Banerjee named the film Roshni after her sister who was raped and killed and said that the movie was a tribute to her. Throughout the years, the film has gained a cult status and is often regarded as Raj Chakraborty's best film.

Plot 
A gang of criminals terrorize the village of Dukhia in rural Bengal, where gang rapes have become common. Both children and aged females are victims. Complicit police authorities refuse to take action against the barbaric criminals because they enjoy an unholy patronage of a local political leader who takes his power and clout for granted. Overcome by a sense of social responsibility, idealist local teacher, Barun Biswas stands up and confronts the scourge and forms an activist group named 'Jagaran Mancha'. They agitate against political patronage the criminals enjoy and demand their immediate arrest. The criminals murder Barun while he was returning from school. Binod Bihari Dutta, who met Barun before his death and was inspired by his idealistic, socially responsible thinking, is shocked to know of Barun's death and rushes to Dukhia to give justice to his memory. He learns of the menace and depravity, the criminals have subjected the village to and the fact that after Barun's death, the criminals were released by the corrupt police officers. Binod Dutta tries to motivate villagers like Barun had done before to continue their fight against this malaise. Special Branch Officer, badass no-nonsense cop Animesh Dutta's posting at Dukhia comes as sweet serendipity, almost divine intervention. He learns of Barun Biswas and his murder from Binod Dutta but friction develops between Binod's idealistic struggle and Animesh' unconventional and semi-legal ways. Mysteriously, the criminals are being murdered one after the other. Rumors float in the village that Barun has returned from the dead to punish his killers. Animesh suspects 'Jagaran Mancha' and believes these killings to be revenge for Barun's murder. He vows to Binod Dutta that he will protect the last criminal as it his duty as a police officer and a public servant. It is revealed that Binod Dutta has been killing the criminals all along in ingenious ways with the help of a few 'Jagaran Mancha' members. After Binod kills the last criminal by ripping his stomach open, Animesh rescues him from the scene, and drops him off outside the village. Animesh has a Machiavellian perspective at the whole thing and decides to bury the case. In the last scene Animesh says he's just become a father and he's going to name his son, "BARUN".

Cast 
Parambrata Chatterjee as Barun Biswas
Paran Bandopadhyay as Binod Behari Dutta
Saswata Chatterjee as Inspector Animesh Dutta
Mimi Chakraborty as Durga
Rudranil Ghosh as Prashanta Mondal 
Padmanabha Dasgupta as Arun Biswas, Barun Biswas's brother
Koushik Roy as Nikhil
Siddhartha Mondal
Dwaipayan Das as Sujoy
Diya Mukherjee as Minister's daughter 
Rupa Bhattacharjee 
Supriyo Dutta as Minister Asim Mondal
Pooja Bose as Special Dancer in "Kala Koi Geli" Item Song

Soundtrack 
The film's soundtrack is composed by Indraadip Dasgupta. Two additional tracks were composed by debut composer Nilesh Dasgupta. Singers Nandini Sarkar and Rajat Taneja were introduced in this film as well as Antara Ganguly. 
The songs were all runaway hits with Hath Dhoreche and Kala Koi Geli being the biggest chartbusters. The making of the song Hath Dhoreche was also released later by Sangeet Bangla. Director Raj Chakraborty stated that the entire song was shot in a situation when the atmospheric temperature was about 35° Celsius, resulting in quite a hardship for the entire cast and crew. For this song, Shreya Ghoshal won Best Female Vocalist.

References

External links
 

Bengali-language Indian films
2010s Bengali-language films
2013 films
Indian crime thriller films
Indian films based on actual events
Films about rape in India
Films directed by Raj Chakraborty
2013 crime thriller films
Films scored by Indradeep Dasgupta